The 1939 Birmingham–Southern Panthers football team was an American football team that represented Birmingham–Southern College as a member of the Dixie Conference during the 1939 college football season. In their twelfth season under head coach Jenks Gillem, the team compiled a 3–5–1 record. After the season, Birmingham–Southern discontinued their football program until its revival in 2007.

Schedule

References

Birmingham–Southern
Birmingham–Southern Panthers football seasons
Birmingham–Southern Panthers football